Blyth Rural District was a rural district in East Suffolk, England, between 1934 and 1974.

The rural district was formed by the merger of parts of Blything Rural District and Plomesgate Rural District with a small parts of Hoxne Rural District, all of which were being abolished.  It covered a coastal area north of Aldeburgh and inland parishes around Saxmundham, although both those towns were excluded from the district.

Shortly after the district's creation the council built itself an office on Rendham Road in Saxmundham, holding its first meeting in the new building (later known as Blyth House) in April 1935.

The district was abolished in 1974 under the Local Government Act 1972, and became part of Suffolk Coastal district.

Statistics

Parishes
Parishes formerly in Blything Rural District: 

Formerly in Plomesgate Rural District: 

 
Formerly in Hoxne Rural District: 
 Badingham, 
 Dennington, 
 Saxtead.

References

Districts of England abolished by the Local Government Act 1972
History of Suffolk